The Gunbarrel Highway is an isolated desert track in the Northern Territory, South Australia and Western Australia. The Gunbarrel Highway connects Victory Downs in the Northern Territory to Carnegie Station in Western Australia. Some sources incorrectly show the highway extending west to Wiluna.

The road was built as part of Australia's role in the weapons research establishment called Woomera which included Emu Field and Maralinga, both atomic bomb testing sites. The name comes from Len Beadell's Gunbarrel Road Construction Party, so named as his intention was to build roads as straight as a gunbarrel.

History 
There were three main reasons for the construction of the Gunbarrel Highway.  The first was to provide access for a future meteorological station which was needed to forecast upper winds prior to the testing of atomic weapons in South Australia. The second was for instrumentation along the centre-line of fire for rockets launched from Woomera. The third was to allow surveyors from the Australian Division of National Mapping to continue the geodetic survey of little known areas of outback Australia.  A consequence of the construction was the completion of the first east-west road link across the centre of Australia.

First stage
The road was built in four stages beginning in 1955. In early November, the Gunbarrel Road Construction Party (GRCP) assembled near Coober Pedy in South Australia, half coming from Adelaide together with a bulldozer, and half with a grader from Maralinga, led by Len Beadell.

Work began on 13 November 1955, and continued westward to Mulga Park. An interruption occurred after about  when the grader's blade mounting bolts were snapped after hitting a submerged Mulga tree root.  Beadell made a hurried return trip to Alice Springs for parts.  The road reached Mulga Park on 2 December, where construction ceased for the year, as the bulldozer's starting pilot motor had failed.

Beadell continued ahead on a ground reconnaissance, then on 7 December made an aerial survey which departed from a natural airstrip in the Mount Davies vicinity, and flew towards the Rawlinson Ranges where the future weather station was to be located.  With the knowledge gained, Beadell led a ground party of four Land Rovers to the site where a stone cairn was built on 12 December.  The site was named Giles after Ernest Giles, the first European to explore the area in 1874.  Beadell's Land Rover suffered a broken rear axle during the return towards Mount Davies, so an axle was borrowed from one of the other vehicles which was left behind to be recovered the following year.

Second stage
In February 1956, the second stage continued from Mulga Park to the Musgrave Ranges, then in March via the Mann Ranges and Tomkinson Ranges to Giles where the party arrived on 29 March.  Beadell had hoped to take the road via Surveyor Generals Corner, but it was too rocky for road building.  The first priority in establishing the weather station was to find water.

A boring plant was obtained from the nearest railhead  to the east.  It was slowly towed to Giles by the grader, and on the fourth drilling attempt, suitable drinking water was discovered.  Work on the Giles establishment continued throughout April and May, which included laying out the airstrip.  In June Beadell and the GRCP were called away to begin work on the Mount Davies road.

In 1957, no further work took place on the Gunbarrel Highway. Beadell continued work at Giles during the early months.

Third stage
The third stage of the highway began with a solo reconnaissance by Beadell from Giles to Warburton on 12 March 1958, when the weather was still very hot. In his book Too Long in the Bush, Beadell described the forbidding conditions in a chapter which he called "An Unshared Nightmare". The extreme heat melted plastic parts of his instrument panel and radio transmitter, and loosened nails in his boots which caused the heels to fall off.  

He lost his appetite and drank hot water only.  His course took him along the southern edge of the Rawlinson Range towards Lake Christopher, then southwards through the eastern edge of the Gibson Desert.  After battling through a series of jumbled sand ridges,  and having three flat tyres, he found that his water supply was almost exhausted.  When clear of the ridges, some rocky hills led to his discovery of a small pool of water in a creek run-off, which saved his life.  He arrived at Warburton and rested for three days prior to the return journey to Giles via a different route.

After a delay caused by rain, building of the next section started on 22 March from Giles, keeping to the north and west of his earlier reconnaissance route, avoiding known obstacles.  The road passed close by the position where it was estimated that Gibson had perished, then turned south towards Warburton, which was reached by early May.  While at Warburton, Beadell and his team built a new airstrip much closer to the mission settlement.

Fourth stage
Building of the fourth stage did not commence until an altered arrangement for the survey took place. Johnson and Beadell both served in the Australian Survey Corps in the Second World War. 

Johnson and Beadell each had a Land Rover in the advance party, and they were followed by two other Land Rovers and a supply truck. The second group included an officer from headquarters in Woomera, and an aboriginal affairs officer. The survey from the turn-off west towards Carnegie Station took place from 14 to 28 May during which a mountain was found. It was named Mount Beadell in honour of Beadell.

Construction of the final section began at Jackie Junction on 3 September, was abeam Mount Beadell on the 25 September, Everard Junction (with the Gary Highway) around 15 October, and reached Carnegie Station on 15 November 1958, just over three years from when the Gunbarrel Highway was begun.

Conditions 
The route is a long and tough haul through very remote territory. Its isolation requires travellers to be totally self-sufficient with water, food and fuel. Part of the road between Jackie Junction and Warakurna, near Giles, is now known as the Old Gunbarrel Highway, and is no longer maintained due to the construction of the more direct route, the Great Central Road.

The route passes directly into Aboriginal land. It is a legal requirement for travellers to hold a valid transit permit at the time of travel. Three free permits are required in Western Australia and a permit is required to enter the APY Lands in South Australia.  

Permits for the abandoned section from Warakurna and Warburton require at least two vehicles and either a HF radio or satellite telephone and requires a minimum of five working days turnaround. Entry to the abandoned section is only permitted at Warakurna or Warburton.  Access to the abandoned section via Jackie Junction is not permitted. Jackie Junction Road is on sacred land and not open to the public.

Map

Major intersections

See also 

 Highways in Australia
 List of highways in the Northern Territory
 List of highways in South Australia
 List of highways in Western Australia

References

External links 

Gunbarrel Highway in Western Australia (ExplorOz)
Department of Indigenous Affairs.

Goldfields-Esperance
Tracks in remote areas of Western Australia
Roads in the Northern Territory
Roads in South Australia
Roads built by Len Beadell
Historic trails and roads in Australia
Far North (South Australia)